Training Day is an American crime-thriller television series that aired on CBS from February 2, to May 20, 2017. The series serves as a follow up to the 2001 film of the same name. It stars Bill Paxton and Justin Cornwell, and is known for being one of Paxton's final performances prior to his death in February 2017.

Premise 
Fifteen years after the events of the film, the series follows Officer Kyle Craig (Justin Cornwell) as he infiltrates the LAPD Special Investigation Section (SIS) by becoming a partner with the morally ambiguous Detective Frank Roarke (Bill Paxton), whose off-the-books record has attracted the attention of the LAPD.

Cast and characters

Main
 Bill Paxton as Detective Frank Roarke, maverick head of LAPD's SIS whose penchant for operating in a gray area to fight the war on crime is called into question.
 Justin Cornwell as Officer Kyle Craig, a rookie cop posing as Frank's new partner in order to keep an eye on Frank.
 Julie Benz as Holly Butler, a Hollywood madam who is in a romantic relationship with Frank.
 Katrina Law as Detective Rebecca Lee, an officer with the SIS, a unit that goes after the worst of the worst. She was rescued from human traffickers by Frank when she was four years old, and looks up to him as the father she never had.
 Drew Van Acker as Detective Tommy Campbell, another SIS officer and a former pro surfer.
 Christina Vidal as Detective III Valeria Chavez, an investigator in Robbery Homicide Division. 
 Lex Scott Davis as Alyse Arrendondo, a history teacher who is Kyle's smart, cynical wife.
 Marianne Jean-Baptiste as Deputy Chief Joy Lockhart, Frank's former supervisor and Kyle's current supervisor who sent him undercover to investigate Frank.

Recurring
 Noel Gugliemi as Moreno, who had appeared in the original film.
 Max Martini as Jack Ivers

Guest
 Jamie McShane as Special Agent Gerald Lynch
 Charles Baker as Clancy Trussell
 Louis Herthum as Henry Hollister
 Lou Diamond Phillips as Thurman Ballesteros
 Brian Van Holt as Jeff Cullen
 W. Earl Brown as Chief Wade
 Eugene Byrd as Detective Windowski
 Jim Piddock as Abel Cribbs
 Thomas F. Wilson as Gary Millstone

Episodes

Production

Development
On August 7, 2015, it was announced that Antoine Fuqua had decided to develop a television series based on a movie, and had teamed with Jerry Bruckheimer to develop the concept. Warner Bros. Television was shopping the show to the American broadcast networks. Will Beall would write the series, while Fuqua would serve as executive producer, and would direct the potential pilot. CBS ordered a pilot on August 14, 2015. In addition to Fuqua, Bruckheimer, Beall, and Jonathan Littman will serve as executive producers for the series, which is set 15 years after the original film. On February 19, 2016, it was announced that Danny Cannon would direct the pilot instead of Fuqua.

Casting 
On February 26, 2016, it was announced that Bill Paxton had joined the production as Frank Rourke, an older, veteran police officer similar to Denzel Washington's character Alonzo Harris in the original movie. Several additional cast members were announced in March 2016. Katrina Law plays Detective Rebecca Lee, an officer with the LAPD's Special Investigation Section (S.I.S.), a unit that goes after the worst of the worst. Drew Van Acker is Tommy Campbell, another S.I.S. officer who is a former pro surfer. Lex Scott Davis is Alyse Arrendondo, a history teacher who is Kyle Craig's wife. Julie Benz is Holly Butler, a Hollywood madam who has a tacit understanding with Frank. Finally, Justin Cornwell was cast as Kyle Craig, Frank's young partner and an analog of Ethan Hawke's character Jake Hoyt in the original movie.

Cancellation
On February 25, 2017, lead actor Bill Paxton died of a stroke at age 61 due to complications from heart surgery. A day later, CBS stated that all 13 commissioned episodes had already been filmed before his death, as shooting already wrapped up in December 2016.

On May 17, 2017, Training Day was cancelled after one season by CBS.

Reception 
Training Day received generally negative reviews from critics. On Rotten Tomatoes, the season has a rating of 24% based on 33 reviews, with an average rating of 4.2/10. The site's critical consensus reads, "Training Day falls short of recapturing the excellence of the film in its television incarnation -- and fails to distinguish itself from the current squad of tired police procedurals." On Metacritic, the season has a score of 38 out of 100, based on 27 critics, indicating "generally unfavorable reviews".

Ratings

References

External links 
 
 

CBS original programming
2010s American crime drama television series
2010s American police procedural television series
2017 American television series debuts
2017 American television series endings
American action television series
English-language television shows
Fictional portrayals of the Los Angeles Police Department
Live action television shows based on films
Television series by Warner Bros. Television Studios
Television shows set in Los Angeles
Neo-noir television series
Crime thriller television series